Juan Ramón Martínez may refer to:

Juan Ramón Martínez (footballer) (born 1948), football player from El Salvador
Juan Ramon Martinez (politician) (born 1941), Honduran writer and politician

See also 
Juan Martínez (disambiguation)